Chief of Staff of the Navy has been the title of the second in command of the Sri Lanka Navy. The post is held by a regular officer of the rank of Rear Admiral and is the second senior position in the navy. Chief of Staff is charged with assisting the Navy Commander in both operational and administrative aspects, functioning as the Acting Navy Commander in his absences or incantation. Chief of Staff is assisted by the Deputy Chief of Staff of the Navy.

List of Chiefs of Staff

References

External links
  Sri Lanka Navy

1949 establishments in Ceylon
Sri Lanka Navy appointments
Lists of Sri Lankan military personnel